The 1994–95 New Jersey Devils season was the 21st season for the National Hockey League franchise that was established on June 11, 1974, and 13th season since the franchise relocated from Colorado prior to the 1982–83 NHL season. Although they played an abbreviated 48-game season, shortened by the 1994–95 NHL lockout, the Devils won their first Stanley Cup championship in franchise history.

The Devils entered the 1995 Stanley Cup playoffs as the second seed in the Atlantic Division. The Devils eventually swept the heavily favored Detroit Red Wings in the Stanley Cup Finals.

Off-season

Preseason
After a 5–2–2 preseason record, the Devils, along with the rest of NHL players, were locked-out from October 1, 1994 to January 11, 1995.

Regular season
During the regular season, the Devils scored the fewest power-play goals (22) and had the fewest power-play opportunities in the NHL, with just 164. They were also the least penalized team, being shorthanded only 149 times.

Standings

Schedule and results

Pre-season

Regular season

Playoffs

Media
Television coverage of the season was carried on SportsChannel New York and SportsChannel New York Plus, with Mike Emrick and Spencer Ross handling play-by-play duties and Peter McNab providing color commentary. On the radio, the games were broadcast on WABC–AM 770, with Mike Miller describing the play and Sherry Ross providing color commentary.

Player statistics

Skaters
Note: GP = Games played; G = Goals; A = Assists; Pts = Points; +/− = Plus/minus; PIM = Penalty minutes

Goaltending
Note: GP = Games played; GS = Games started; TOI = Time on ice; W = Wins; L = Losses; T = Ties; GA = Goals against; GAA = Goals against average; SO = Shutouts; SA = Shots against;  SV% = Save percentage; G = Goals; A = Assists; PIM = Penalty minutes

† Denotes player spent time with another team before joining the Devils. Stats reflect time with the Devils only.
‡ Denotes player was traded mid-season. Stats reflect time with the Devils only.

Awards and records

Awards

Records

Milestones

Transactions
The Devils have been involved in the following transactions during the 1994–95 season.

Trades

Free agents

Draft picks

Below are the New Jersey Devils' selections at the 1994 NHL Entry Draft, which was held on June 28 and 29, 1994.

Notes

References

New Jersey Devils seasons
New Jersey Devils
New Jersey Devils
New Jersey Devils
New Jersey Devils
New Jersey Devils
20th century in East Rutherford, New Jersey
Eastern Conference (NHL) championship seasons
Meadowlands Sports Complex
Stanley Cup championship seasons